Bognor Regis, sometimes simply known as Bognor, is a town and seaside resort in West Sussex on the south coast of England,  south-west of London,  west of Brighton,  south-east of Chichester and  east of Portsmouth. Other nearby towns include Littlehampton east-north-east and Selsey to the south-west. The nearby villages of Felpham, and Aldwick are now suburbs of Bognor Regis, along with those of North and South Bersted. The population of the Bognor Regis built-up area, including Felpham and Aldwick, was 63,855 at the 2011 census.

A seaside resort was developed by Sir Richard Hotham in the late 18th century on what was a sand and gravel, undeveloped coastline. It has been claimed that Hotham and his new resort are portrayed in Jane Austen's unfinished novel Sanditon.  The resort grew slowly in the first half of the 19th century but grew rapidly following the coming of the railway in 1864.   In 1929 the area was chosen by advisors to King George V which led to its regal suffix, by royal consent. Butlin's has been present in the town since the early 1930s when an amusement park and zoo were opened. A holiday camp followed in 1960 and this has more recently moved towards hotel accommodation with modern amenities.

Etymology
Bognor is one of the oldest recorded Anglo-Saxon place names in Sussex. In a document of AD 680, it is referred to as  meaning Bucge's (an Anglo-Saxon name) shore, or landing place.

History
Bognor Regis was originally named just "Bognor", being a fishing (and smuggling) village until the 18th century, when it was converted into a resort by Sir Richard Hotham who renamed the settlement Hothamton, although this did not catch on. It has been postulated that Hotham and his new resort are portrayed in Jane Austen's unfinished novel Sanditon.

Bognor was originally part of the ancient parish of Pagham in the county of Sussex, with a port or haven on the Aldingbourne Rife. From around 1465 it was included in the parish of Bersted before attaining ecclesiastical parish status separate from South Bersted in 1873. Until 1894 it formed part of the Hundred of Aldwick, an ancient division of Chichester Rape. From 1894 to 1974 it was part of Bognor Regis Urban District.

On the beach between Bognor Regis and Aldwick lies the wreck of a floating pontoon (caisson) which was once part of the Mulberry floating harbours used by the Allies to invade the French coast on D-Day 6 June 1944. It was a part of the Mulberry harbour which broke free in a storm on 4 June, the day before it was due to go over the channel to Arromanches. This particular section of Mulberry was abandoned and did not make it across the Channel. It was washed up on the beach shortly after D-Day.

There is a memorial to the brave men who were involved in the Mulberry Harbour project. The memorial was placed there in June 1999, and states: "To mark the 55th Anniversary of D-Day in 1944. This plaque is erected as a memorial to mark the historical association that Pagham Beach had with the Mulberry Harbour Project in support of the liberation of Europe." The plaque continues 'some 50 had been assembled between Pagham beach and Selsey. To hide them from enemy view they were sunk to await refloating when the invasion got under way'. Finally, the plaque records "The Mulberry Harbour project was without doubt, a great feat of British and allied engineering skills, many still remain at Arromanches in Normandy."

The historic meeting of the crews (and associated handshake) of the Apollo-Soyuz Test Project on 17 July 1975 was intended to have taken place over Bognor Regis, but a flight delay caused it to occur over Metz in France instead.

Bognor Regis town centre was damaged in 1994 by an IRA device left in a bicycle outside Woolworth's. Fifteen shops were damaged but no injuries occurred.

"Bugger Bognor"
King George V had become ill, requiring lung surgery to be carried out on 12 December 1928.  His recovery was slow and on 22 January 1929 Buckingham Palace issued the statement saying "it has been realised by the King's medical advisers that, prior to the establishment of convalescence, there would arrive a time when sea air would be necessary in order to secure the continuation of His Majesty's progress".  The Palace statement went on "with the knowledge, a careful search was made for a "residence" not only suitable in itself but possessing the necessary attributes of close proximity to the sea, southern exposure, protection from wind, privacy and reasonable access to and from London."  The residence selected was Craigweil House, Bognor (demolished in 1939) placed at His Majesty's disposal by owner Sir Arthur Du Cros who was a wealthy businessman, having acquired the house from Dr Stocker who bought it from the Countess of Newburgh who had constructed the building in 1806.  The house, technically, was in Aldwick.  As a result, the King was asked to bestow the suffix "Regis" ("of the King") on "Bognor".  The petition was presented to Lord Stamfordham, the King's Private Secretary, who in turn delivered it to the King. King George supposedly replied, "Oh, bugger Bognor." Lord Stamfordham then went back to the petitioners and told them, "the King has been graciously pleased to grant your request."

A slightly different version of the "Bugger Bognor" incident is that the King, upon being told, shortly before his death, that he would soon be well enough to revisit the town, uttered the words "Bugger Bognor!" Although there is little evidence that these words were actually spoken in this context, and although the sea air helped the King to regain his health, it is certain that the King had little regard for the town.

Butlins

Billy Butlin made his first appearance in the town with his Recreation Shelter, which was situated on the corner of Lennox Street and the Esplanade. The Recreation Shelter was to prove to be a popular entertainment venue, containing one-armed-bandits and dodgem cars. This was eventually followed on 5 July 1933 by the Butlin Zoo on the seafront, which contained a wide array of animals, including brown, black and polar bears, hyenas, leopards, pelicans, kangaroos, monkeys and "Togo the snake king". Within three years, Billy Butlin was opening his first holiday centre at Skegness. Eventually, in 1958, the Bognor Regis town council announced that they had reached an agreement with Butlin to take on the 39 acre Brookland site to build a holiday camp, the site on which Butlins still stands today. The camp first opened to the public on 2 July 1960.

Geography

Town

The town has several areas, and buildings, that still link it with its past. Good examples, and prominent local landmarks, are the Royal Norfolk Hotel and Hotham Park.

The Anglican parish church is dedicated to St. Wilfrid while the local Roman Catholic church is Our Lady of Sorrows Church.

Bognor Regis lies within the constituency of Bognor Regis and Littlehampton, the MP for which is Nick Gibb (Conservative).

Climate  
Bognor Regis experiences an oceanic climate (Köppen climate classification Cfb) similar to almost all of the United Kingdom albeit sunnier and milder due to its proximity to the coast - It has, at over 1,900 hours on average, the highest known annual level of sunshine of any British mainland weather station resulting in Bognor Regis being named the sunniest town in Britain. Besides inhibiting summer cloud development, its coastal location also prevents extreme temperatures; Whereas locations in the Sussex Weald, to the North, can, on occasion, fall below  or rise above , since 1960, the temperatures recorded at Bognor have never fallen below   (January 1963) or risen above   (June 1976). Rainfall in Bognor peaks during the winter months, and reaches a minimum in summer, as is typical for the South Coast of England.

Tourism

Billy Butlin opened one of his Butlin's Holiday Camps in Bognor in 1960. The camp later became known as Southcoast World until 1998 and is now known as Butlin's Bognor Regis Resort.  In 1999 Butlin's erected a large indoor leisure park, the buildings construction sharing aspects similar with the Millennium Dome in London. In 2005, a new £10m hotel, called "The Shoreline" was unveiled at the Bognor Regis resort. A second hotel "The Ocean" opened on the site in Summer 2009 and general landscaping and upgrading have also taken place. A third hotel "Wave" opened in Summer 2012.

In 2017 Bognor Regis Town Council appointed a Town Crier to promote tourism. Jane Smith can be seen regularly during the year, giving proclamations in the town and along the seafront in her regal purple and gold livery.

Culture and community

Culture

Birdman of Bognor
The International Bognor Birdman is an annual competition for human-powered 'flying' machines held each summer on Bognor Regis Pier. Contestants launch themselves from the end of the Grade II listed pier, a prize being awarded to the one who glides the furthest distance. Rarely taken completely seriously, the event provides competitors with an opportunity to construct improbable machines complete with outlandish dress, and is viewed as a display of British eccentricity. The spectacle draws a sizeable crowd in addition to the local media. Inaugurated in nearby Selsey in 1971, the Birdman transferred to Bognor in 1978 when it had outgrown its original location. Competitors have included Richard Branson.

The Birdman Event of 2008 was transferred to Worthing after  of the pier had been removed by the owners due to storm damage in March 2008. This meant that there were question marks over the possible safety of the contestants landing in shallower water. The shortened pier was judged safe for the event in 2010, and the event subsequently returned to Bognor.

Music scene and festivals
Each summer Bognor Rox free music and arts festival  is held. 2015 was to be the 25th anniversary of the ROX Music and Arts Festival which attracts over 30,000 visitors and features many genres of music in seven performance areas over two days.  The town is also home to the Bognor Regis Concert Band, who perform at various local locations and events, including the yearly "Proms in the Park" hosted at Hotham Park.

Theatre and cinema
The Picturedrome Cinema in London Road has been trading as a cinema for over 100 years. It has been extensively refurbished, the freehold having been acquired by the Bognor Regis Town Council to secure the building's future, after extensive consultation.

The Alexandra Theatre is a 357-seat auditorium showing a variety of entertainment from comedy to drama to pantomime. It was built in 1979 on the site of the former Edwardian Theatre Royal complex.  It is currently run by a voluntary trust and shows a mixture of local groups, tribute bands and concerts.

The film The Punch and Judy Man (1963), starring Tony Hancock, was partly shot in Bognor Regis. Several scenes of the film Wish You Were Here (1987) were also filmed in Bognor Regis. The BBC series Don't Forget the Driver (2019) starring Toby Jones was filmed and set in Bognor.

Community facilities

Bognor Regis War Memorial Hospital first opened in 1919 and is managed by the Sussex Community NHS Trust. Bognor Regis Town Hall was designed by Charles Cowles-Voysey and completed in 1930.

Education
Bognor Regis has two secondary schools, The Regis School and Felpham Community College. The area also has several primary schools, both in Bognor Regis and Felpham.

Bognor Regis also hosts a university campus of the University of Chichester.

Sport 
Bognor Regis Town F.C. plays in the Isthmian Premier Division. They play their home games at Nyewood Lane.

Middleton & Bognor Hockey Club play their home matches at Littlehampton Academy.

There are two cricket clubs: Bognor Regis Cricket Club and Pagham Cricket Club.

Transport

Bognor Regis railway station is on a branch line from Barnham, on the West Coastway Line. It has half-hourly services to London and to other south coast towns, some being direct. Trains are operated by Southern using Class 377s and Class 313s.

Road links
A29. Towards Dorking to the north, south of which it joins the A24 to London. This road bisects the main east–west trunk road, the A27, at Fontwell and the A272 at Billingshurst.
A259. The coastal road running along the south coast from  Havant in Hampshire to Folkestone in Kent.

Politics
Since 1997 Bognor Regis has been in the parliamentary constituency of Bognor Regis and Littlehampton. Prior to this, it was in the constituencies of Arundel (1974–1997) and Chichester (1885–1974). Bognor is an electoral ward of Arun District.

Twin towns

Bognor Regis is twinned with:
 Saint-Maur-des-Fossés, France
 Weil am Rhein, Germany
 Trebbin, Germany

Notable people
 Frederick Albert Bridge (1841–1917), photographer, died after a fall while on holiday in Bognor.
 Sir Richard Hotham (1722–1799), property developer and politician associated with the development of Bognor Regis as a seaside resort.
 Edward Morris (1940-2016), art historian, born in Bognor.
 Cynthia Payne (1932–2015), brothel keeper, born in Bognor.
 The Formula One driver David Purley (1945–1985), best known for his attempt to save the life of fellow racing driver Roger Williamson during the 1973 Dutch Grand Prix, was born in Bognor Regis, where he was killed after crashing his aerobatic biplane into the sea off Bognor on 2 July 1985.
 Dante Gabriel Rossetti (1828–1882), one of the founders of the Pre-Raphaelite Brotherhood, painter and poet; worked at a studio in Belmont Street from 1875 to 1876.
 Eric Coates (1886–1957), composer of marches and rhapsodies including The Knightsbridge March, By the Sleepy Lagoon and the Dambusters March.
 James Joyce (1882–1941), novelist, author of Ulysses; worked on Finnegans Wake while staying in Bognor in 1923.
 Mary Wheatland (1835–1924) swimming instructor and lifesaver. Saved over 30 people from drowning off the town's beaches.

See also
Regis (place)
List of place names with royal patronage in the United Kingdom
List of places of worship in Arun

References

Notes

External links

Bognor Regis Town Council

 
Arun District
Seaside resorts in England
Towns in West Sussex
Populated coastal places in West Sussex
Beaches of West Sussex